Patrick Alfred Palmer (1914-1988) was an English boxer who competed for England.

Boxing career
Palmer won a gold medal in the flyweight division at the 1934 British Empire Games in London defeating Maxie Berger of Canada in the final on points.

He won the 1934 Amateur Boxing Association British flyweight title, when boxing out of the Battersea & Shexgar ABC.

Personal life
He lived in Battersea.

References

1914 births
1988 deaths
English male boxers
Commonwealth Games gold medallists for England
Commonwealth Games medallists in boxing
Boxers at the 1934 British Empire Games
Flyweight boxers
Medallists at the 1934 British Empire Games